Charles G. Häberl (born 1976 in New Jersey, United States) is an American religious studies scholar, linguist, and professor. He is currently Professor of African, Middle Eastern, and South Asian Languages and Literatures (AMESALL) and Religion at Rutgers University. Häberl's primary interests include Mandaeism, Semitic philology, and Middle Eastern studies. He is known for his translation of the Mandaean Book of John in collaboration with James F. McGrath, as well as for his research on the Neo-Mandaic dialect of Khorramshahr, Iran.

Biography
Häberl was born and raised in New Jersey, United States. He holds a PhD degree in Semitic philology from the Department of Near Eastern Languages and Civilizations at Harvard University. As part of his doctoral research, Häberl documented the Neo-Mandaic dialect of Khorramshahr, Iran. Häberl is currently a professor at Rutgers University.

From 2009 to 2012, he was the Director of the Center for Middle Eastern Studies at Rutgers University and in 2013-2019, chair of the department. He was also the Near East Regional Director for the Catalogue of Endangered Languages. In 2007, the first ever awarded U.S. Department of Education Title VIA Undergraduate International Studies and Foreign Language (UISFL) program grant to support instruction on Iranian Studies was authored by him. He became an Anna-Maria Kellen Fellow at the American Academy in Berlin in 2016. In 2021, he was elected as the president of the International Linguistic Association which publishes WORD and currently serves on the board of the Endangered Language Alliance of NYC.

Selected publications

Monographs
A selection of monographs authored by Häberl:

2020. The Mandaean Book of John: critical edition, translation, and commentary. Berlin: De Gruyter. (with James F. McGrath)
2009. The Neo-Mandaic Dialect of Khorramshahr. Wiesbaden: Harrassowitz. (published revision of Häberl's 2006 doctoral dissertation)

Articles and chapters
A selection of Häberl's journal articles and book chapters:

Articles authored

Häberl, Charles G. (2007). Introduction to the New Edition, in The Great Treasure of the Mandaeans, a new edition of J. Heinrich Petermann’s Thesaurus s. Liber Magni, with a new introduction and a translation of the original preface by Charles G. Häberl. Gorgias Press, LLC. 

Book chapters

References

External links
 Faculty page at Rutgers University
 Academia.edu
 

1976 births
Living people
Rutgers University faculty
Harvard Graduate School of Arts and Sciences alumni
Brown University alumni
Religious studies scholars
Scholars of Mandaeism
Grammarians of Aramaic
Academics from New Jersey
Linguists from the United States
Translators from Mandaic